In metadata, an identification scheme is used to identify unique records in a set.

If a data element is used to identify a record within a data set, the data element uses the Identifier representation term.

An identification scheme should be contrasted with a classification scheme.  Classification schemes are used to classify individual records into categories.  Many records in a data set may be in a single category.

See also
 Classification scheme
 Metadata
 Representation term

Metadata